Alistair Morgan Bowie (born 20 April 1951) is a retired Scottish amateur football centre half and midfielder who made over 120 appearances in the Scottish League for Queen's Park.

References

Scottish footballers
Scottish Football League players
Queen's Park F.C. players
Association football fullbacks
1951 births
Alumni of the University of Glasgow
Footballers from Glasgow
Living people
Scotland amateur international footballers
Glasgow University F.C. players